The Indiana Department of Environmental Management (IDEM) is the agency of the U.S. state of Indiana charged with protecting the environment and human health. There are many offices within IDEM and each has a specific role in environmental protection. According to the department's website, their mission is "to implement federal and state regulations to protect human health and the environment while allowing the environmentally sound operations of industrial, agricultural, commercial and government activities vital to a prosperous economy"

History 

The Indiana Department of Environmental Management was created an act passed by the Indiana General Assembly and signed into law by Governor Robert D. Orr in 1986.
This act moved pollution control efforts (Indiana Air Pollution Control Board, Indiana Stream Pollution Control Board and the Indiana Environmental Management Board) from the Indiana State Department of Health to the new agency on July 1, 1986.

Organization 

At the top of the organization is the Commissioner (presently Brian C. Rockensuess), who reports directly to the Governor of Indiana. In addition to overseeing the department, the director also serves on an autonomous board known as the Environmental Rules Board, consisting of both government officials and citizen members, which meets monthly to address issues pertaining to environmental rules development as prescribed by state statute.

Beneath the Commissioner, there are four Assistant Commissioners and Chief of Staff and General Counsel, each of whom is responsible for a team under which many of the department's offices are organized. Those teams and their divisions are as follows:

•	Chief of Staff
 •	Finance
 •	Information Services
 •	Human Resources
 •	Legislative Affairs
 •	Media & Communications
•	Office of Air Quality
 •	Air Monitoring
 •	Compliance and Enforcement
 •	Operations
 •	Permits
 •	Programs
•	Office of Land Quality
 •	Compliance and Emergency Response
 •	Operations
 •	Permits
 •	Remediation
 •	Science Services
 •	Underground Storage Tanks
•	Office of Legal Counsel
 •	Contracts, Ethics and Personnel
 •	Public Records
 •	Rules Development
•	Office of Program Support
 •	Agriculture Liaison
 •	Recycling Programs and Compliance Assistance
 •	Regional Offices
•	Office of Water Quality
 •	Wastewater Compliance
 •	Drinking Water
 •	Permitting
 •	Surface Water, Operations, and Enforcement
 •	Watershed Planning and Assessment

See also
 Climate change in Indiana

References

External links
 Official Website

Environmental Management
State environmental protection agencies of the United States
Natural resources agencies in the United States
1986 establishments in Indiana